Paul Zerdin (born 21 August 1972) is a British comedian and ventriloquist from London. He was the winner of the 10th season of America's Got Talent.

Early life
When Zerdin was 10, a family friend made him a puppet theatre which he used to put on shows. Having failed his GCSEs, Zerdin got a job in a magic shop, developing his magic skills along the way. Simultaneously, he was also developing a sideline as a children's entertainer.

Career
Zerdin made his TV debut as a magician on the BBC's Tricky Business. Shortly afterwards, at the age of 20, Zerdin landed a two-year contract presenting the Disney-produced children's programme Rise and Shine for GMTV.

In 1996, Zerdin was the first outright winner – by over 100,000 votes – of LWT's The Big Big Talent Show, hosted by Jonathan Ross. The experience introduced him to Nigel Lythgoe, who took Zerdin under his wing, paving the way for appearances on shows including Tonight at the London Palladium and The Generation Game. Lythgoe secured Zerdin a spot on The Prince's Trust Gala Show in 1997.

During the 2016-17 Christmas season, Zerdin played Cinderella's sidekick Buttons in the London Palladium production of the pantomime Cinderella, leading the Radio Times to dub him "inspired casting." The magazine added that "His quick wit, rapport with the crowd and astonishing skills with puppet Sam turn the often toe-curling audience participation bits (don't sit in the front row) into genuinely hilarious moments."

Got Talent

In 2015, Zerdin auditioned for the tenth season of America's Got Talent, successfully earning a place in the live rounds of the contest, before eventually winning the finals on 16 September 2015. Alongside winning $1 million, Zerdin was given his own headline show in Las Vegas. Entitled Mouthing Off, it ran for four months in 2016, between 14 May and 4 September, at Planet Hollywood, before closing due to low attendance figures. In 2019, Zerdin returned to partake in the programme's spin-off contest, America's Got Talent: The Champions, in January, and the spin-off contest, Britain's Got Talent: The Champions, in July later that year, but failed to reach the final of either show.

Filmography

Television

Stage

Film

See also
 Ventriloquism

References

External links

1972 births
Living people
America's Got Talent winners
Comedians from London
Ventriloquists